Karl Pojello (born Karolis Požėla, February 13, 1893 – September 4, 1954) was a Lithuanian  and later American professional wrestler and promoter.

Early life 
Pojello was born in Steigviliai, Russian Empire in 1893. In 1906, he moved to St. Petersburg, Russia, to work in a pharmacy owned by his brothers Antanas and Motiejus. During World War I he fought on the side of the Russian army.

Wrestling career 
At the age of 18 he was thought to be one of the best amateur wrestlers in Russia. In 1913 Požėla won an international wrestling tournament in Breslav.

As a successful amateur wrestler, he joined a group of professional wrestlers traveling from city to city. With them he traveled to and wrestled in China, Japan, and in 1924 he came to Chicago. His career took a drastic turn, when in 1927, he met a Lithuanian wrestling promoter A. Tamašiūnas. There he beat Canadian wrestling champion Carl van Wurden in under 3 minutes. But it wasn't until he beat Johnny Mayers, another Lithuanian wrestler, considered to be middleweight champion of the world, when he came to fame and recognition. At the time he was one of the most popular professional wrestlers in the United States. 

Pojello met Maurice Tillet in Singapore in February 1937, and convinced him to become a professional wrestler. Pojello went back to Europe with Tillet and wrestled there until the start of World War II, when he and his friend were forced to return to the US.

Death 
Karolis Požėla died on September 4, 1954 from lung cancer. Upon hearing of the death of Karl, Maurice Tillet had a heart attack. He was taken to Cook County Hospital where he died on the same day. They are buried together at the Lithuanian National Cemetery. Pojello's friend and promoter Tamašiūnas built them a gravestone. Text on the gravestone reads: "Friends Whom Even Death Couldn't Part".

Championships and accomplishments 

 European Heavyweight Championship (1 time)

References 

1893 births
1954 deaths
People from Pakruojis District Municipality
People from Ponevezhsky Uyezd
Soviet emigrants to the United States
American people of Lithuanian descent
American male professional wrestlers
Russian male professional wrestlers
Deaths from cancer in Illinois
Deaths from lung cancer